Arthur O'Connor may refer to:
Arthur O'Connor (United Irishman) (1763–1852), United Irishman and later a general in Napoleon's army
 Arthur O'Connor (MP) (1844–1923), Member of Parliament for Queen's County
Art O'Connor (1888-1950), Irish politician, lawyer and judge